The Woral C. Smith Lime Kiln and Limestone House near Fairbury, Nebraska was built in 1874.  It was listed on the National Register of Historic Places in 1974.

It consists of a lime kiln built in 1874 and a one-and-a-half-story house built of limestone and lime in 1876.

References

External links

Lime kilns in the United States
National Register of Historic Places in Jefferson County, Nebraska
Buildings and structures completed in 1874